Morlik Keita (born 3 September 1994) is a Liberian professional footballer who plays as a goalkeeper for Liberian First Division club Mighty Barrolle and the Liberia national team.

References 

1994 births
Living people
Liberian footballers
Association football goalkeepers
Mighty Barrolle players

Liberian First Division players
Liberia international footballers